A list of Principals of Lady Margaret Hall, Oxford. The head of Lady Margaret Hall, University of Oxford is called the Principal. The current Principal is Professor Stephen Blyth, since October 2022.

References

 
Lady Margaret Principals
Lady Margaret Hall, Oxford